LENA is a developer of advanced technology and programs to accelerate language development of children 0–3 and to close opportunity gaps.

The nonprofit organization uses a technology system that comprises a LENA device, patented processing software, and secure, cloud-based data access. The technology is used as the cornerstone of programs aimed at increasing interactive talk between children and caregivers, implemented by community organizations around the world.

The LENA System is also used by researchers at universities such as Harvard, MIT, Brown University and Stanford University, hospitals, and other research institutions, where it has been used to study subjects such as how language builds children's brains, autism, child language acquisition, and communication in deaf and hard of hearing families.

History
The LENA Research Foundation, a nonprofit organization, was created in 2009 through a donation of assets of Infoture Inc. by Terrance "Terry" and Judith "Judi" Paul, who were also majority owners of Renaissance Learning Inc. (RLI).

As the founder of Renaissance Learning, Terry Paul became familiar with the achievement gap caused by differences in home language environments. In 1998 he read Meaningful Differences in the Everyday Lives of Young American Children by Betty Hart, Ph.D., and Todd Risley, Ph.D. Based on data gathered through an intensive longitudinal study, Meaningful Differences revealed that the number of adult words spoken to children from birth to three predicted almost all of the variance in the children's language ability and IQ at age three.
 
Terry realized that with the help of advanced speech recognition technology he could streamline the data acquisition process and provide parents with a tool that was easy to use and could thoroughly chart a child's natural language environment. He called it LENA (for “language environment analysis”).

In 2004 Terry started Infoture, Inc. and hired a team of scientists, engineers, and scientific advisors to conduct the research and development work for the LENA System. Infoture launched a pilot version of the LENA System in February 2006. In February 2009 the Pauls donated the assets from Infoture and a gift of $2 million to create the LENA Research Foundation, a nonprofit organization. In January 2018, the organization changed its name to LENA and adopted the tagline "Building brains through early talk."

Philosophy
LENA's organizational goals are based on science that shows that the more talk and conversational engagements a child experiences in the first four years of life, the better off he or she will be in academics and society. This is based on research from Harvard University showing that interactive talk between children and caregivers is one of the most important factors affecting early brain development.  New research from MIT published in February 2018 confirmed that conversational turns are responsible for activation in Broca's area in children. LENA has several programs designed to encourage interactive talk between children and caregivers, including programs aimed at parents, childcare providers and home visitors.

Scientific background 
A growing body of research shows that early childhood contains "critical periods" for tasks such as language acquisition, meaning that the first three years are a once-in-a-lifetime opportunity for development. Early childhood development drives success in school and life, fostering cognitive skills like attentiveness, self-regulation, motivation, and sociability. Interactive talk—and more specifically, conversational turns—have been proved to be a key factor in stimulating brain growth during these important years, according to the Center on the Developing Child at Harvard University. Additionally, longitudinal research from LENA has found that the amount of conversation children experience between the ages of 18–24 months is related to their IQ, verbal comprehension, and language skills during adolescence. Investing early in children can lead to huge social and economic gains. Research has shown investments in young children can lead to reductions in criminal activity later in life, 13 percent returns on investment annually, and positive effects that last for several generations.

LENA System
LENA stands for "Language ENvironment Analysis". LENA technology provides more than 25 different metrics on the natural language environment of children, including estimates and percentile scores for adult words spoken to the child, conversational turns, and child vocalizations. The system also generates an automatic expressive language developmental age and percentile score based on a child's voiceprint.

Core Language Metrics
 Adult Word Count (AWC): The AWC is the number of words a child hears from an adult within a specific period. LENA provides breakdowns of AWC in five-minute, hourly, daily, and monthly reports.
 Conversational Turns (CTs): CTs occur when a child vocalizes (initiates) and an adult responds or an adult speaks (initiates) and a child responds. Each time that happens one turn is counted. CTs are one of the only ways to measure engaged interaction with a child. LENA offers breakdowns of CTs in five-minute, hourly, daily, and monthly reports.
 Child Vocalizations (CVs): A CV is counted when child speech of any length is surrounded by greater than 300 milliseconds of silence or other sound that is not child speech. CVs do not include cries or vegetative sounds. LENA provides breakdowns of CVs in five-minute, hourly, daily, and monthly reports.

How LENA Works

A parent or teacher places a LENA device in his or her children's LENA vest and records an entire day of the child's sound environment. The device is then connected to a computer with special software that processes the recording into data metrics including the child's exposure to verbal stimulation, the number of child utterances, and other information. As pediatricians do with a child's height and weight, the system also generates percentile scores comparing the child's vocalizations with those of other children the same age.

Product line

LENA Start
LENA Start is a program for parents that uses regular feedback from the LENA System plus 13 weekly group sessions to help improve the home language environment. Since its introduction in 2015, LENA Start has been implemented by school districts, library systems, and other types of organizations in Huntsville, Alabama, San Mateo County, California, Ames, Iowa, Longmont, Colorado, and Minneapolis, Minninnesota, and other sites across the country. Texas Children's Hospital is the first regional healthcare center to adopt the model. In October 2020 amid the restrictions of Covid-19 pandemic, Read Aloud Delaware began a virtual LENA Start program with families statewide. Parents are provided with feedback and participate in one-hour Zoom workshops each week during the 10-week program. LENA facilitators offer simple techniques to help them increase their children’s exposure to oral language while wearing the 'talk pedometers.' [37]

LENA Grow 
LENA Grow is a professional development program for teachers who work in early childhood classrooms. According to LENA's website, "LENA’s talk reports for teachers focus primarily on conversational turns, a strong measure of interactive talk." Training teachers how to increase conversational turns is important because children can spend up to 60 percent of their time in childcare. The program was first piloted in Escambia County, Florida before launching at sites around the country.

LENA Home 
LENA Home is a supplement to existing parent coaching curriculums. Typically, home visitors facilitate use of the LENA System to help parents track their progress towards increasing interactive talk in their homes.

LENA SP 
LENA SP is the version of LENA designed for researchers and language professionals to use.

Developmental Snapshot
The LENA Developmental Snapshot, based on a 52-question parent survey, assesses both expressive and receptive language skills and provides an estimate of a child's developmental age from 2 months to 36 months.

LENA Research Foundation findings
 Parents estimate that they talk more with their children than they actually do.
 Most language training comes from mothers, with mothers providing 75 percent of the total talk in a child's environment.
 Mothers talk approximately 9 percent more to their daughters than to their sons.
 Parents talk more to their firstborn child than to their other children.
 Most adult talk in a child's environment occurs in the late afternoon or early evening.
 Children of talkative parents are also talkative.
 The more television a child watches, the lower his or her language ability scores tend to be.
 Parents of children with autism tend to talk less the more severe their child's symptoms. Conversely, the stronger their child's language abilities, the more parents talk.

References

External links
 LENA
 PNAS study on automated vocal analysis

Communication disorders
Computational linguistics
Early childhood educational organizations
Companies based in Colorado
Pervasive developmental disorders
Speech recognition
2009 establishments in the United States